Ekaterina Ivanovna Glazyrina (born 22 April 1987) is a Russian biathlete.

Career
She has competed in Biathlon World Cup since 2011. Glazyrina has won several medals at the European championships, including two gold medals in the relay event.

On 10 February 2017, IBU provisionally suspended her for doping violations during the 2014 Winter Olympics. On 4 May 2018, she was disqualified for two years, and all her results from 2013 were annulled.

References

External links 
 IBU profile
 

1987 births
Living people
Russian female biathletes
Biathletes at the 2014 Winter Olympics
Olympic biathletes of Russia
Doping cases in biathlon
Russian sportspeople in doping cases
People from Chaykovsky, Perm Krai
Sportspeople from Perm Krai
21st-century Russian women